This list of power stations in Scotland includes current and former electricity-generating power stations in Scotland, sorted by type. Scotland is a net exporter of electricity and has a generating capacity of over 10GW. None of this is generated by conventional oil- or gas-burning power stations, instead using one large gas turbine power station and two large nuclear power stations, as well as several hydro-electric schemes in the Highlands comprising over 80 generating stations with a combined capacity of 1.4GW.  Scotland also has an increasing number of wind farms, due to the large proportion of upland areas. As of July 2010, there were 100 operating wind farms in Scotland with a combined capacity of 8GW; and a further 96 projects under construction or consented, with capacity of 2GW. A number of other power plants include an experimental wave power generator on Islay, and Steven's Croft near Lockerbie, the UK's largest wood-fired biomass power station. Since 2016 no coal fired power stations are operating in Scotland.

A red background denotes a power station that is no longer operational, and a green background denotes a power station that is currently operational.

Nuclear power stations

Coal-fired

Oil- and gas-fired

Hydro-electric

Pumped-storage hydro-electric
Hydroelectricity relies on gravity to propel water through power-generating turbines. The difference in height between the turbine and the water source is known as the "head". Scotland has two pumped-storage hydro-electric power stations, which pump water back up to a storage reservoir during periods of off-peak demand. Drax Group PLC's Cruachan Power Station was the first such station in the world when it opened in 1965. It can hold  of energy, equivalent to 22 hours of full production. 12 hours is reserved for black start.

SSE have proposed building two new pumped storage schemes in the Great Glen; 600 MW at Balmacaan above Loch Ness, and 600 MW at Coire Glas above Loch Lochy, at £800m. 

Scotland has a potential for around 500 GWh of pumped storage.

Conventional hydro-electric
Several of Scotland's hydro-electric plants were built to power the aluminium smelting industry, but many more were built in the mid-20th century by the North of Scotland Hydro-Electric Board to supply the communities of the Highlands. These were built in several "schemes" of linked stations, each covering a catchment area, whereby the same water may generate power several times as it descends.

Wind power

Onshore

Offshore

Others

See also 

 List of largest power stations in the world
 List of power stations in England
 List of power stations in Northern Ireland
 List of power stations in Wales
 Scottish Power Company Limited
 South of Scotland Electricity Board
 North of Scotland Hydro-electric Board

References

External links
 
  Includes a list of currently generating power stations in the United Kingdom
  

 
Power stations in Scotland
Scotland
Scotland
Electricity policy in Scotland